Old Fort Duquesne, or, Captain Jack, the Scout is an historical novel by the American writer Charles McKnight (1826 - 1881) set in 1750s Pittsburgh, Pennsylvania. The novel tells the story of Captain Jack, a scout and Indian fighter, who is the protagonist of this retelling of the events of Fort Duquesne during the French and Indian War.

External links
 Old Fort Duquesne, or, Captain Jack, the Scout (1873) at the University of Pittsburgh
 

1873 American novels
Novels set in the 1750s
Novels set in Pittsburgh